Halolactibacillus halophilus is a non-spore-forming, halophilic and alkaliphilic bacterium from the genus of Halolactibacillus which has been isolated from algae from the Kanagawa Prefecture in Japan.

References

External links 

Type strain of Halolactibacillus halophilus at BacDive -  the Bacterial Diversity Metadatabase

Bacillaceae
Bacteria described in 2005